Roberta Francina Astrid Oosenbrug-Blokland (born 6 July 1968) is a Dutch politician who served as a member of the House of Representatives between 20 September 2012 and 23 March 2017. She is a member of the Labour Party (PvdA). Born in Rotterdam, she previously was a member of the municipal council of Lansingerland from 2010 to 2012.

References

1968 births
Living people
Labour Party (Netherlands) politicians
Members of the House of Representatives (Netherlands)
Municipal councillors in South Holland
People from Lansingerland
Politicians from Rotterdam
21st-century Dutch politicians
21st-century Dutch women politicians